Merișoru may refer to several villages in Romania:

 Merișoru, a village in Vârfuri Commune, Dâmbovița County
 Merișoru, a village in Papiu Ilarian Commune, Mureș County
 Merișoru de Munte (Merisor), a village in Cerbăl Commune, Hunedoara County

See also 
 Măru (disambiguation)
 Merești (disambiguation)
 Merișor (disambiguation)
 Merișani (disambiguation)